Middendorf's vole (Microtus middendorffi) is a species of rodent in the family Cricetidae. It is found only in Russia, most commonly north Siberia.

The common name commemorates Alexander Theodor von Middendorff (1815–1894), a German–Russian naturalist who traveled extensively in Siberia. It is also known as the north Siberian vole or Altai vole.

This vole, along with Microtus gregalis, is one of the primary preys of the Arctic fox on the Yamal Peninsula.

References

Musser, G. G. and M. D. Carleton. 2005. Superfamily Muroidea. pp. 894–1531 in Mammal Species of the World a Taxonomic and Geographic Reference. D. E. Wilson and D. M. Reeder eds. Johns Hopkins University Press, Baltimore.

Microtus
Mammals described in 1881
Mammals of Russia
Taxonomy articles created by Polbot
Taxobox binomials not recognized by IUCN